British-Irish boy band One Direction including Harry Styles, Niall Horan, Louis Tomlinson, Liam Payne, Zayn Malik have recorded material for five studio albums. Apart from their album songs, the band has released several non-album singles, such as the charity singles "One Way or Another (Teenage Kicks)" and "God Only Knows".

"Forever Young", which would have been released if they had won The X Factor, was their first unofficial single. "What Makes You Beautiful", was released as their debut single and lead single from their debut studio album, Up All Night (2011). They made history as the first U.K. group to bow at number one on the Billboard 200 with a debut album. "Gotta Be You", "One Thing", and "More than This" were the other three singles from their debut album with the first two being top-ten singles in the UK.

The band's second studio album, Take Me Home, was released in November 2012. The lead single "Live While We're Young" was released on 30 September 2012, and recorded the highest opening week sales figure for a song by a non-US artist. "Little Things" and "Kiss You", the succeeding singles, were also successes.

One Direction's third studio album, Midnight Memories, was released on 25 November 2013. The album was preceded by its lead single "Best Song Ever" and its critically acclaimed second single "Story of My Life". The album was a huge commercial success, debuting at number one on the UK Albums Chart and the Billboard 200. Their fourth studio album, Four, was released on 17 November 2014.  It reached number one on the UK Albums Chart and the Billboard 200 following its release.

Their fifth studio album, Made in the A.M., released on 13 November 2015, was One Direction's final album before the group's indefinite hiatus in January 2016. "Drag Me Down" served as the lead single from the album.

Tracks

Notes and references
 Notes

 References

One Direction